Woolston is a light industrial and residential suburb of Christchurch in the South Island of New Zealand. It is situated three kilometres southeast of the city centre, close to major arterial routes including State Highways 74 and 76 to Banks Peninsula. The Heathcote River flows through the suburb. Famous for its laydown center in Manning Place. This is a lower socio economic area. Still very beautiful

History

In pre-European times the Woolston was not clearly identified.  Local Māori people gathered food from the mudflats at Ferrymead at the eastern end of modern Woolston.  The Māori name for the mudflats was "Ohika paruparu" (meaning women gathering shellfish often sank to their thighs in the mud).  This is the only name known to have been used to describe the area prior to European settlement.

Early European records name the western area of Woolston as Roimata, meaning teardrop in Māori. To this day some land titles in this area reference Roimata as their location. More recently the name has been revived by the Roimata Community Incorporated Society (Roimata Community Inc.) and Christ Church Roimata (an independent Anglican church), which are geographically and community-based organisations actively working in Roimata.  Its boundaries are defined as Ensors Road, Brougham Street, Ferry Road and Richardson Terrace.

One of the first signs of a growing European community in the Woolston area was the establishment of a Christian church, the Anglican Parish of St John the Evangelist Woolston, which belongs to the Christchurch diocese.  The origins of the Parish date back to 1857 when the first Cob Church was built on the current site.  In 1882 a new timber church was built.  In 1960 the existing concrete Church building was built and dedicated (consecrated 1963).  These church buildings are used daily for worship and many other religious and community activities.  It is open to the public on Sundays.  It is situated on Ferry Road at the eastern end of Woolston Village. The Parish was officially recognised one year after Christchurch was officially recognised as a City in 1856, the same year that the Anglican Diocese of Christchurch was established.  St Johns is one of the oldest Anglican parishes in New Zealand.

Woolston initially belonged to the Heathcote District. In the 1850s and 1860s, wharves along the Heathcote River were used by small ships to service the area.  Before the Lyttelton Rail Tunnel was opened in 1867, all the incoming trade arrived in Ferrymead and was transported through Woolston (along Ferry Road) into Christchurch.  The road went from the wharf in Lower Heathcote to what is now the corner of High and Madras Streets.  The area became quite industrialised after the tunnel opened. Ferry Road later carried the tramlines to Sumner.

Up until early 1870 the area was commonly referred to as Lower Heathcote.  At a meeting about the Heathcote Road drain a local store owner, Joseph Harry Hopkins (1837–1910), named the area Woolston after his birthplace Woolston in Southampton, England.  On 16 June 1870, in response to a petition to the postmaster-general, Julius Vogel, objecting to the post office being called Ferry Road, the name Woolston was gazetted. Woolston became a district in 1882, and remained a self-governing borough until 1921, when it was amalgamated with Christchurch.

Joseph Harry Hopkins (1837–1910) was a shopkeeper and postmaster in Woolston who established the Woolston Emporium in 1863. The Woolston Emporium had six departments: drapery, clothing, boots, grocery, crockery, ironmongery, and a corn store. Hopkins Street, named in 1924, commemorates Joseph Hopkins.

Evangelical leader William Orange was born at Woolston in 1889.

Woolston Cut

The Heathcote River provided Woolston much needed water for industries like wool scouring, which needed plentiful water.  In 1966 the Woolston industrial sewer was built, and up until that time the river had become increasingly polluted.

Flooding had also become a problem and in 1986 the Woolston Cut began to allow flood waters to bypass a long loop of the river. Extensive investigations revealed that the trees died from salt water travelling further upstream with every tide (with the salt killing the trees), that the soil structure changed (a sodium / calcium exchange in the clay molecules weakened the soils) and the Tunnelling mud crab had extended its range up the river, further weakening the banks. As a mitigating measure, the Woolston Tidal Barrage was built at the upstream end of the cut, which is only opened in time of floods. During normal flow regimes, the Heathcote remains to flow through what is called the Woolston Loop.

Today

In later years Woolston's close proximity to the Lyttelton rail line continued to sustain Woolston as a prime location for industry.  Over the 20th century the area grew to become the centre of the New Zealand rubber industry.  Other industries grew here and included a nugget factory and a gelatine and glue works.  Many of these businesses are still present in one form or another.  Woolston hosts Christchurch's largest container terminal.

Residential growth from the city gradually moved out through the Woolston area and it is now well merged with Christchurch City. Te Ara, the on-line Encyclopaedia of New Zealand, says that "Factory workers living nearby gave Woolston a strong working-class identity."

Woolston is home to The Woolston Drivebys, an indoor football team. The Woolston Brass Band, established in 1891, has gained a national reputation and has won many competitions.

Heritage buildings
Prior to the February 2011 Christchurch earthquake, the following heritage buildings were listed with the New Zealand Historic Places Trust:
 A & T Burt building, the former Nugget Boot Polish Factory (Category II), built in 1924, it was damaged beyond repair in the February 2011 earthquake and demolished later that year.
 Bloomsbury (Category II), a large residential building at 37 Maunsell Street.
 Jubilee Hospital (Category I), a hospital for the old and infirm established in 1888 in the Woolston Loop. It closed in 1990 and some of the buildings were demolished. The remaining buildings house a fish processing plant.
 Stone Cottage (Category II), built in 1863 from Port Hills stone and these days used as Dizzy Lizzy's restaurant and catering service.
 Whalebone Cottage (Category II), built in ca 1867. Whale ribs used to form an arched gateway for over a century, but those bones are no longer there.
 Woolston Borough Monument (Category II), a monument from 1893.

Demographics
Woolston comprises five statistical areas. Woolston North, West and East and Ensors are primarily residential. Woolston South is primarily industrial.

Residential areas
The residential areas of Woolston cover .

The residential areas had a population of 10,131 at the 2018 New Zealand census, an increase of 315 people (3.2%) since the 2013 census, and an increase of 642 people (6.8%) since the 2006 census. There were 3,984 households. There were 5,154 males and 4,983 females, giving a sex ratio of 1.03 males per female, with 1,863 people (18.4%) aged under 15 years, 2,028 (20.0%) aged 15 to 29, 4,788 (47.3%) aged 30 to 64, and 1,455 (14.4%) aged 65 or older.

Ethnicities were 77.5% European/Pākehā, 15.1% Māori, 7.7% Pacific peoples, 10.3% Asian, and 2.4% other ethnicities (totals add to more than 100% since people could identify with multiple ethnicities).

The proportion of people born overseas was 21.8%, compared with 27.1% nationally.

Although some people objected to giving their religion, 52.8% had no religion, 33.3% were Christian, 1.9% were Hindu, 0.8% were Muslim, 0.6% were Buddhist and 3.1% had other religions.

Of those at least 15 years old, 1,158 (14.0%) people had a bachelor or higher degree, and 2,037 (24.6%) people had no formal qualifications. The employment status of those at least 15 was that 4,215 (51.0%) people were employed full-time, 1,050 (12.7%) were part-time, and 387 (4.7%) were unemployed.

Woolston South

Woolston South had a population of 507 at the 2018 New Zealand census, a decrease of 12 people (-2.3%) since the 2013 census, and an increase of 33 people (7.0%) since the 2006 census. There were 216 households. There were 282 males and 225 females, giving a sex ratio of 1.25 males per female. The median age was 39 years (compared with 37.4 years nationally), with 75 people (14.8%) aged under 15 years, 105 (20.7%) aged 15 to 29, 261 (51.5%) aged 30 to 64, and 66 (13.0%) aged 65 or older.

Ethnicities were 72.8% European/Pākehā, 13.6% Māori, 5.9% Pacific peoples, 9.5% Asian, and 3.6% other ethnicities (totals add to more than 100% since people could identify with multiple ethnicities).

The proportion of people born overseas was 21.9%, compared with 27.1% nationally.

Although some people objected to giving their religion, 53.3% had no religion, 30.2% were Christian, 1.8% were Hindu, 0.6% were Buddhist and 4.7% had other religions.

Of those at least 15 years old, 54 (12.5%) people had a bachelor or higher degree, and 84 (19.4%) people had no formal qualifications. The median income was $29,000, compared with $31,800 nationally. The employment status of those at least 15 was that 240 (55.6%) people were employed full-time, 51 (11.8%) were part-time, and 21 (4.9%) were unemployed.

Economy

Woolston has become a retail hub in recent times.

The Tannery is established in Woolston in 2013. It features 60 stores, includes the Deluxe Cinemas complex.

Further east, the Woolston Village features around-again cycles, a supermarket, and various takeaways, bars, and restaurants.

Education
Ngutuawa School and Te Waka Unua School are full primary schools for years 1 to 8. Ngutuawa started as Bamford School in 1952. It was damaged in the Christchurch earthquakes, and moved to a new site with the new name in 2020. Te Waka Unua opened in 2015 after the merger of Phillipstown School with Woolston School.

St Anne's Catholic School and Tamariki School are state-integrated full primary schools for years 1 to 8. St Anne's was established in 1906. Tamariki opened in 1966. It provides education following the principles of A. S. Neill.

Kimihia Parents' College is a Teen Parent Unit of Linwood College.

All these schools except Kimihia are coeducational. Rolls are as of

References

Suburbs of Christchurch